The Mission Canyon Formation is a geologic formation in Montana and Wyoming. It preserves fossils from the Mississippian period.

See also
 List of fossiliferous stratigraphic units in Montana
 Paleontology in Montana

References
 

Geology of Montana
Devonian System of North America
Geology of Wyoming